John Cooke may refer to:

Politicians
John R. Cooke (1788–1854), Virginia planter, lawyer and politician
John Robert Cooke (1866–1934), political figure in Ontario
John Herbert Cooke (1867–1943), Australian politician
John B. Cooke (1885–1971), served in the California legislature
John H. Cooke (1911–1998), New York politician and judge
John Warren Cooke (1915–2009), American politician
John William Cooke (1919–1968), Argentine politician and revolutionary
John Cooke (Colorado politician) (fl. 2000s–2020s)

Sports
John Cooke (Oxford University cricketer) (1808–1841), English cricketer 
John Cooke (Derbyshire cricketer) (1851–1908), English cricketer
John Cooke (footballer, born 1878), English professional footballer
John Cooke (rower) (1937–2005), American rower at the 1956 Olympics
John Cooke (sport shooter) (1939–2008), British sport shooter
John Cooke (footballer, born 1942), English professional footballer
John Cooke (footballer, born 1962), English professional footballer

Other people
John Cooke (composer), English composer with works in the Old Hall Manuscript
John Cooke (fl. c. 1611), author of the play Greene's Tu Quoque
John Cook (regicide) (1608–1660), English Solicitor General, prosecuted King Charles I
John Cook (pirate) or John Cooke (died 1684), English pirate, associate of Edward Davis
John Cooke (Six Preacher) (1646/7–1726), Anglican clergyman
John Cooke (judge) (1944–2022), Irish judge
John Cooke (lawyer) (1666–1710), English lawyer
John Cooke (academic) (1734–1823), Vice-Chancellor of Oxford University
John Cooke (physician) (1756–1838), British physician, Fellow of the Royal Society and of the Society of Antiquaries of London
John Cooke (Royal Navy officer) (1763–1805), British captain killed at the Battle of Trafalgar
John Cooke (entrepreneur) (1824–1882), American locomotive maker
John Esten Cooke (1830–1886), American novelist, Confederate Army officer
John Peyton Cooke, American novelist
John Rogers Cooke (1833–1891), Confederate general during the American Civil War
John Starr Cooke (1920–1976), American mystic and spiritual teacher
John Cooke (RAF officer) (1922–2011), British doctor and senior Royal Air Force officer
John Byrne Cooke (1940–2017), American author, musician and photographer

See also
John Cook (disambiguation)
John Coke (disambiguation) (pronounced Cook)